Representing the Mambo is the ninth studio album by the American rock band Little Feat, released in 1990. It peaked at No. 45 on the Billboard 200. The band supported the album with a North American tour. "Texas Twister" and "Rad Gumbo" were released as singles.

Production
The majority of the album was recorded at Skywalker Ranch, following a week's worth of work in Los Angeles. The album cover art is by Neon Park. Craig Fuller, Bill Payne, and Paul Barrère sang on Representing the Mambo.

"Those Feat'll Steer Ya Wrong Sometimes" is about a band member failing to get out of a speeding ticket. "Teenage Warrior" is about gang warfare in Los Angeles.

Critical reception

The Calgary Herald wrote that "one or two tunes sound interesting (the album has a Steely Dan-like studio polish to it), but nothing holds up to even cursory scrutiny." The Sun-Sentinel opined that "though the band still packs a tremendous one-two punch with its rich mix of country rock and blues, the crackle that marked Let it Roll, as well as previous releases, is nowhere to be found." The Chicago Sun-Times praised "the evocative, cinematic title cut."

The Ottawa Citizen noted that "there are hints of the post-psychedelic country-rock of Little Feat's infancy, which usually rings stale." The St. Petersburg Times determined that "some of the new album treads closely to standard rock-radio fare." The Times deemed Representing the Mambo "a more full-tilt slice of Southern rock-a-boogie funk."

Track listing
"Texas Twister" (Barrère, Kibbee, Payne, Tackett) – 4:45
"Daily Grind" (Barrère, Fuller, Payne) – 5:06
"Representing the Mambo" (Barrère, Park, Payne, Tackett) – 5:54
"Woman in Love" (Barrère, Payne, Tackett) – 3:49
"Rad Gumbo" (Barrère, Clayton, Gradney, Kibbee, Park, Payne) – 3:29
"Teenage Warrior" (Barrère, Fuller, Payne, Tackett) – 4:53
"That's Her, She's Mine" (Barrère, Clayton, Payne) – 4:09
"Feelin's All Gone" (Fuller) – 4:59
"Those Feat'll Steer Ya Wrong Sometimes" (Barrère, Fuller, Hayward, Payne, Tackett) – 5:01
"The Ingenue" (Barrère, Fuller, Payne, Tackett) – 4:22
"Silver Screen" (Barrère, Payne, Tackett) – 4:22

Personnel
Paul Barrère – guitar, vocals
Sam Clayton – percussion, vocals
Craig Fuller – vocals, guitar
Kenny Gradney – bass
Richie Hayward – drums, vocals
Bill Payne – keyboards, synthesizer, vocals
Fred Tackett – guitar, trumpet
Renee Armand – backing vocals ("Those Feat'll Steer Ya Wrong Sometimes")
Peter Asher – dialogue ("Representing the Mambo")
Michael Brecker – saxophone ("The Ingenue")
Sharon Celani – backing vocals and dialogue ("Representing the Mambo")
Marilyn Martin – backing vocals ("Representing the Mambo" and "Silver Screen"), dialogue ("Representing the Mambo")
Neon Park – dialogue ("Representing the Mambo")
Shaun Murphy - backing vocals ("That's Her She's Mine")

Notes 

Little Feat albums
1990 albums
Warner Records albums
Albums produced by Bill Payne
Albums produced by George Massenburg
Albums with cover art by Neon Park